Yiğit Aslan (born 11 March 2003) is a Turkish swimmer competing in freestyle events. He obtained a quota for the 2020 Summer Olympics.

Inspired by a poster about a swimming course in a shopping mall, he started swimming sport at the age of ten. Aslan is a member of Enka SK. He was coached by the Italian Corrado Rosso in the national team.

He won the bronze medal in the 4 × 100 m freestyle relay event at the 2019 European Youth Summer Olympic Festival held in Baku, Azerbaijan. He competed in the 400 m, 800 m, 1500 m and 4 × 200 m freestyle relay events of the 2020 European Aquatics Championships in Budapest, Hungary.

As of January 2021, he was the owner of 38 national records in various events and age categories, all set in the last five years. He is the holder of national records in the 800 m (7:51.60) and 1500 m (14:44.03) events. At the 2020 European Aquatics Championships in Budapest, Hungary, he set a new national record with 3:50.59 in the 400 m juniors (age 17-18) event.

References

External links

2003 births
Living people
Turkish male freestyle swimmers
Enkaspor swimmers
Swimmers at the 2020 Summer Olympics
Olympic swimmers of Turkey
Wisconsin Badgers men's swimmers
21st-century Turkish people